Vytautas Šustauskas (born 19 March 1945) is a Lithuanian politician, leader of the Union of the Fighters for Lithuania (Kovotojų už Lietuvą sąjunga) political party.

External links 

 
 https://www.youtube.com/watch?v=e_TosLga7ZU
 https://www.youtube.com/watch?v=CtEqMpB6uwY&feature=fvst

1945 births
Living people
Mayors of places in Lithuania
Politicians from Kaunas
Members of the Seimas
Lithuanian Liberty Union politicians
Klaipėda University alumni
People from Kelmė District Municipality
21st-century Lithuanian politicians